Cliburn is a village and civil parish in the Eden district of Cumbria, England. The civil parish includes the hamlet of Town Head. In 2001 the population was 204, increasing to 274 at the 2011 Census.

History and Geography
Cliburn village is situated at crossroads on the east–west running C3047 (minor road) between Bolton and Penrith and a north–south road connecting Morland in the south to the A66(T). The River Leith runs through the village south of the road. The village was served by Cliburn railway station on the Eden Valley railway line 1 km north of the village, and the village pub was called the Railway Inn, but after the station closed the name was changed to the Golden Pheasant Inn, the pub is now closed.

The etymology of the name Cliburn comes from clay and burn "clay stream", also  interpreted as "Stream by the bank". Cliburn has been known as Cleburn or Cleyburn. Cliburn was historically in Westmorland.

Cliburn Hall

Cliburn Hall, a three-storey Pele tower was built in 1387 by Robert de Cliburn. Alterations and additions were made in 1567 by Richard Cliburn. In 1872 the tower was de-castellated, and given a gabled roof. Originally there was an additional square tower at the south side of the building.

A stone inscription from the building reads:Richard Cleburn this they me calledIn which my time hath built this HallA.D. 1567

St Cuthbert's Church

The nave and chancel of St Cuthberts Church date from the 12th century and the church is a Grade II listed building. The church was restored in the 19th century and all the windows except one date from that period.

The rectory lies between the village and former railway station.

Other features
Cliburn Bridge, at the south of the village over the River Leith on the road to Morland, and Cliburn Mill Bridge to the east at the confluence of the Leith and the River Lyvennet on the road to Bolton are built of local red sandstone. They were built after 1822 when a powerful flood destroyed the earlier bridges.

Cliburn Moss, northwest of the village is a national nature reserve (NNR).

A school was endowed in 1807. The school/house was rebuilt in 1877.

See also

Listed buildings in Cliburn, Cumbria
Whinfell Forest is a large wood to the northwest and location of a Centre Parcs UK holiday park.

References

Maps

Further reading
Westmorland Heritage, Alfred Wainwright,  2006, p. 62 "Cliburn", google book preview

External links

  Cumbria County History Trust: Cliburn (nb: provisional research only - see Talk page)
Cliburn www.visitoruk.com

Villages in Cumbria
Civil parishes in Cumbria
Eden District